Shadrack Kosgei (born 24 November 1984 in Uasin Gishu) is a Kenyan runner.

At the 2005 World Cross Country Championships he finished tenth in the short race. The Kenyan team, of which Kosgei was a part, won the silver medal in the team competition.

He is based at the PACE Sports Management training camp in Kaptagat.

External links

PACE Sports Management

1984 births
Living people
Kenyan male long-distance runners
Kenyan male cross country runners